Lambert (died after 938) was the second son of Adalbert II of Tuscany and Bertha, daughter of Lothair II of Lotharingia. He succeeded his elder brother, Guy, as count and duke of Lucca and margrave of Tuscany on his death in 938 or 939 without heirs. 
In 931, before 17 October, Hugh, King of Italy, disowned and removed Lambert, giving Tuscany and the familial possession of Lucca to his brother Boso. Hugh was Guy and Lambert's half-brother, as they had the same mother.  When Guy died, Hugh married  Guy's widow, Marozia.

10th-century deaths
Margraves of Tuscany
Counts of Lucca
Nobility from the Republic of Lucca
Year of birth unknown
House of Boniface
Dukes of Italy